Sir Henry King, 3rd Baronet PC (I) (c. 1681 – 1 January 1740) was an Anglo-Irish politician.

King was the second son of Sir Robert King, 1st Baronet, and Frances Gore. He sat in the Irish House of Commons as the Member of Parliament for Boyle between 1707 and 1727. In 1720 he succeeded his elder brother, John, to the family baronetcy. He represented Roscommon County from 1727 to 1740. In 1733 he was made a member of the Privy Council of Ireland.

He married Isabella Wingfield, daughter of Edward Wingfield and Eleanor Gore, and sister of Richard, 1st Viscount Powerscourt in April 1722, and had seven children. Their eldest son, Robert King, was made Baron Kingsborough in 1748, while their second son, Edward King, was made Earl of Kingston in 1768. Their daughter Isabella married Thomas St Lawrence, 1st Earl of Howth.

References

|-

Year of birth unknown
1740 deaths
18th-century Anglo-Irish people
Baronets in the Baronetage of Ireland
Irish MPs 1703–1713
Irish MPs 1713–1714
Irish MPs 1715–1727
Irish MPs 1727–1760
Henry
Members of the Privy Council of Ireland
Members of the Parliament of Ireland (pre-1801) for County Roscommon constituencies
Year of birth uncertain